Shan Tao may refer to:

Shan-tao (a.k.a. "Shandao" and "Zendo"), the third patriarch of Pure Land Buddhism, Chinese monk and influential writer
Shan Tao (basketball), basketball player
Shan Tao (Taoist), one of the Seven Sages of the Bamboo Grove